The Mermaid Madonna is a novel written by Greek writer Stratis Myrivilis. The work has been translated into English by Abbott Rick. The work, set in Greece after the First World War is, according to Kirkus Reviews, "poetic" and contains relatively little dialogue.

References

Greek novels
1949 novels